Hugh Mitchell may refer to:
 Hugh Mitchell (politician) (1907–1996), American politician, U.S. Senator from Washington
 Hugh Mitchell (Scottish footballer) (1849–1937), Scottish member of the Royal Engineers who played in the 1872 FA Cup Final
 Hugh Mitchell (actor) (born 1989), English actor
 Hugh Mitchell (American football) (1890–1967), American football player and coach
 Hugh Mitchell (Australian footballer) (born 1934), Australian rules footballer and coach
 Hugh Henry Mitchell (1770–1817), British military leader